Pratigya is a Bhojpuri musical drama film directed by Sushil Kumar Upadhyay and starring Dinesh Lal Yadav, Pawan Singh,  Pakhi Hegde, and Sonali Joshi. The film was a box office success.

Plot
Two brothers Harnam Singh (Kunal Singh) and Bhairav Singh (Avdhesh Mishra) who used to love each other endlessly—but greediness and hatred changed everything. Suddenly one day Bhairav Singh puts the blame on Harnam Singh's pregnant wife Madhvi that she is characterless so that he alone becomes the owner of the property. According to the plan, Bhairav make Harnam marry another person. There Madhvi bears all the pain and gives birth to Suraj (Dinesh Lal Yadav). Here Harnam's second wife Saarangi gives birth to Pawan (Pawan Singh). When Suraj grows big—on listening to the violence done with his mother he decides that he will vanish all the blame put on his mother and he goes to Harnam Singh to take the revenge for the violence done to his mother. There Suraj meets Harnam Singh and his stepbrother Pawan Singh and he also meets Bhairav Singh and his three sons Abhay, Nirbhay and Durjan. Suraj get successful in claiming the plans in which his mother was targeted and vanishes of the blames put on his mother which he had promised.

Cast
 Dinesh Lal Yadav as Suraj
 Pawan Singh as Pawan
 Pakhi Hegde as Geeta
  Sonali Joshi as Sundari
Monalisa as item number

Soundtrack

See also
 Bhojpuri cinema

References

2008 films
2000s Bhojpuri-language films